The Second Battle of Tongo-Tongo took place on December 27 and 28, 2018 during the Sahel War.

Battle 
On December 27 and 28, 2018, the Nigerien army and French troops from the Barkhane force carried out an operation in the Tongo-Tongo region, near the border with Mali, where a year earlier around ten Nigerien soldiers and Americans had been killed in an Islamic State In the Greater Sahara ambush. The attack began on the night of the 27th to the 28th with a combined raid of Mirage and Attack helicopters, with the support of a Reaper drone and a C135 tanker plane, in an area within a radius of action of fifteen kilometers . The strikes then target jihadists probably belonging to the Islamic State in the Great Sahara according to the French army . Nigerien soldiers and French soldiers from the mountain commandos and parachute commandos then lead the ground attack supported by helicopters and seize different positions. The area is then searched for 48 hours.

Casualties 
According to the French army, around fifteen jihadists were killed in the operation. About twenty motorcycles were recovered, as were 26 weapons, including machine guns, as well as ammunition. The French and Nigerien troops did not suffer any losses.

References 

Mali War
Battles in 2018
2018 in Niger